S.P.R is a historical castle located in Neyriz County in Fars Province, The longevity of this fortress dates back to the Historical periods after Islam.

References 

Castles in Iran